I Corps is a corps of the Korean People's Army Ground Force. It is headquartered at Hoeyang-up, Hoeyang County,

History 
The Corps was activated in 1950 with a strength of 5,000 men. It took command of the North Korean divisions on the eastern sector, in the Seoul area, with the NK II Corps on its flank. It reportedly controlled the 1st, 3rd, 4th, 6th, 13th Divisions in the initial attack.

It advanced during the early phase of the Korean War, then fought in the Battle of Pusan Perimeter.

Its headquarters is now reported as Hoeyang County, Kangwon Province.

Corps Organization
According to United States Far East Command Headquarters intelligence section as of 31 July 1952 a Korean People's Army Corps was commanded by a lieutenant general. The commanding general had an aide and four officers reporting directly to him. The Chief of Staff headed the corps staff section, while the corps political commander, artillery commander and rear services commander directed the operations of their respective sections. Additionally, the corps headquarters had direct command of various combat, combat support and combat service supports battalions and regiments.

The corps chief of staff directed the staff section of the corps headquarters. The  section was made up of:
Operations
Reconnaissance
Signal
Officer Personnel
Enlisted Personnel
History
Cryptographic
Administration
Finance
Documents
Engineers

The corps artillery section, led the corps artillery commander was also divided up into different parts:
Operations
Reconnaissance
Communications
Personnel
Survey
Artillery Supply
Records

The corps political commander, responsible for political education and loyalty had five different parts.
Political Training
Socialist Patriotic Youth League
Propaganda
Cultural
Civil Affairs

The rear services commander had largest section as well as the staff officer with operational units compromising part of it.
Staff Sections
Organization & Planning
Administration
Provisions
Clothing
Ordnance
Food Service
Transportation
Intendance & Finance 
Vehicle Maintenance
Road Maintenance
Medical
Fuel
Service Units
Transportation Battalion 
Field Hospital
Evacuation Medical Battalion

These independent assets were:
Artillery Regiment
Anti-Tank Battalion
Replacement and Training Regiment
Engineer Battalion
Reconnaissance Battalion
Signals Battalion

As of 31 July 1952, the U.S Far East Command reported the composition of I Corps units as follows:

 8th Division
81st Regiment
82nd Regiment
83rd Regiment
Artillery Regiment
9th Division
85th Regiment
86th Regiment
87th Regiment
Artillery Regiment
47th Division
2nd Regiment
3rd Regiment
4th Regiment 
Artillery Regiment

See also

II Corps
III Corps
IV Corps
V Corps
XII Corps
No Kwang-chol:briefly was head or the corp.

References

Bibliography

Corps0001
Corps0001NK
Military units and formations established in 1950